The Meishan is a breed of domestic pig named for the Meishan, Jiangsu Province, China. It is a sub-group of the Taihu pig and is a small to medium-sized (275-400 lbs) breed with large drooping ears, and wrinkled black skin. Meishan Pigs are extremely docile and renowned for their tender and flavorful red meat pork.

Native to Southern China, the breed is best known for its large litters of 15-22 piglets. Due to its fecundity, it was imported to the United States in 1989 by the USDA Agricultural Research Service. All US research on the Meishan pigs was terminated in 2016 and the remaining pigs were dispersed to US farmers. In 2018 the Meishan Pig was declared critically endangered worldwide by the Livestock Conservancy.

Today the Meishan Pig is the focus of a major conservation effort involving the Livestock Conservancy and the American Meishan Breeders Association. The number of breeders in the US is rising primarily due to the Meishan Pigs adaptability to small holder farms.

See also
 List of domestic pig breeds
 Okja

References

Pig breeds originating in China